The 2017 UNLV Rebels football team represented the University of Nevada, Las Vegas in the 2017 NCAA Division I FBS football season. The Rebels were led by third-year head coach Tony Sanchez and played their home games at Sam Boyd Stadium. They were members of the West Division of the Mountain West Conference. They finished the season 5–7 and 4–4 in Mountain West play to finish in third place in the West Division. Following the season, head coach Tony Sanchez released Kent Baer (defensive coordinator/linebackers) and Andy LaRussa (special teams/safeties) from their contracts.

Schedule

Schedule Source: 2017 UNLV Rebels Football Schedule

Game summaries

Howard

UNLV's season-opening loss to Howard represented the largest upset in college football history in terms of point spread. Howard was a 45 point underdog to UNLV and pulled the upset on the back of quarterback Caylin Newton, brother of NFL quarterback Cam Newton, who had 330 total offensive yards in the game.

at Idaho

at Ohio State

San Jose State

San Diego State

at Air Force

Utah State

at Fresno State

Hawaii

BYU

at New Mexico

at Nevada

References

UNLV
UNLV Rebels football seasons
UNLV Rebels football